The men's Greco-Roman bantamweight was one of 13 wrestling events held as part of the wrestling at the 1928 Summer Olympics programme. It was the second appearance of the event. The competition was held from August 2 to 4, and featured 19 wrestlers from 19 nations.

Competition format

This Greco-Roman wrestling competition introduced an elimination system based on the accumulation of points. Each round featured all wrestlers pairing off and wrestling one bout (with one wrestler having a bye if there were an odd number). The loser received 3 points. The winner received 1 point if the win was by decision and 0 points if the win was by fall. At the end of each round, any wrestler with at least 5 points was eliminated.

Results

Round 1

Four wrestlers finished the round with 0 points (3 winners by fall, 1 bye). Six had 1 point after winning by decision. The nine bout losers each had 3 points. Zervinis withdrew after his bout.

 Bouts

 Points

Round 2

Lindelöf and Leucht stayed at 0 points, winning their second match each by fall. Three additional men remained undefeated at 2–0 and 1 point after a win by fall and a win by decision; Zombori was 2–0 with 2 points because both wins were by decision. Mollins, who had a bye, was 0–1 with 3 points; also at 3 points were three men with a loss and a win by fall. Three men had a loss and a win by decision, with 4 points. Five were eliminated with 0–2 records (and 6 points) through two rounds.

 Bouts

 Points

Round 3

Gozzi won by fall, staying at 1 point. Leucht and Lindelöf each won by decision to gain their first point apiece, creating a three-way tie at 1 point. Zombori's bye kept him at 2 points. Pütsep's first loss took him from 1 points to 4. Maudr had 2 points. Andersen, who had lost in the first round, won again by fall to stay at 3 points. Ahlfors, who started the round tied with Andersen, won by decision to pick up his 4th point. Five men were eliminated: Mollin, at 0–2, had 6 points because of a bye; Sabo was also at 6 points at 1–2 with the win by fall; three others were 1–2 with 7 points because each one's win came by decision.

 Bouts

 Points

Round 4

Zombori won by decision, receiving his 3rd point and eliminating Ahlfors with the latter man's second loss. Lindelöf similarly eliminated Andersen and picked up his 2nd point—and taking sole possession of the lead. Gozzi and Leucht, who had started tied with Lindelöf in first place at 1 point, each survived his first loss, to Maudr and Pütsep, and finished the round with 4 points. Maudr finished the round with 3 points after winning by decision. Pütsep was eliminated with 5 points despite winning in the round, as it was his second win by decision to go along with one prior loss.

 Bouts

 Points

Round 5

Leucht and Maudr were the only men to finish the round still in contention, the former after a bye and the latter after defeating Lindelöf. Gozzi was eliminated with 5 points despite winning, as the win by decision put him at the threshold. Lindelöf's first loss put him at 5 points as well, necessitating a bronze medal bout between him and Gozzi. Zombori finished in 5th place.

 Bouts

 Points

Round 6

The final round featured a gold medal bout and a bronze medal bout. Gozzi beat Lindelöf on points to take the bronze medal. Leucht pinned Maudr to win gold. 

 Bronze medal bout

 Gold medal bout

 Points

References

Wrestling at the 1928 Summer Olympics